Father Sergei Spytetsky (Polish: Sergiusz Spytecki) (12 July 1877- 28 August 1963) was an Orthodox (and later Greek-Catholic) priest.

Biography

Sergei Spytetsky was born on July 12, 1877 in Berdyansk, Zaporizhia Oblast, now Ukraine. In 1904, he was ordained as a priest in the Russian Orthodox Church, and also served as a priest in the Orthodox Diocese of Pinsk. In March 1924, Spytetsky converted to the Catholic Church under the tutorship of Henrik Pshezdzetskim, who was then Bishop of the Roman Catholic Diocese of Siedlce.

Spytetsky later served in various parishes located in: Old Pavlov, Bubel, Jani-Podlaskie, Dokudovo and Terespol. In 1937, he organized an Uniate parish in Biala Podlaska. On December 22, 1939, he retired and settled in Siedlce, Poland. He died in Siedlce on August 28, 1963.

Sources

Author: Fr. Zbigniew Nikoniuk, "Kostomłoty way to unity", page 65

External links
 http://unici.pl/content/view/29.html

Converts to Eastern Catholicism from Eastern Orthodoxy
Former Russian Orthodox Christians
Ukrainian Eastern Catholics
1877 births
1963 deaths
People from Berdiansk